The 2004 Delaware Fightin' Blue Hens football team represented the University of Delaware as a member of the South Division of the Atlantic 10 Conference (A-10) during the 2004 NCAA Division I-AA football season. Led by third-year head coach K. C. Keeler, the Fightin' Blue Hens compiled an overall record of 9–4 with a mark of 7–1 in conference play, sharing the A-10 South Division title with James Madison and William & Mary. Delaware advanced to the NCAA Division I-AA Football Championship playoffs, where the Fightin' Blue Hens beat Lafayette in the first round before losing to William & Mary in the quarterfinals. The team played home games at Delaware Stadium in Newark, Delaware.

Schedule

References

Delaware
Delaware Fightin' Blue Hens football seasons
Atlantic 10 Conference football champion seasons
Delaware Fightin' Blue Hens football